Gordon Dickson (born 10 December 1954) is a former Scotland international rugby union player.

Rugby Union career

Amateur career

He played for Gala.

He broke his leg playing for Gala, just weeks before his wedding; and so he had to hobble down the church aisle with a cast on his leg. His wife was a Scotland international hockey player.

The couple later moved to Western Australia.

Provincial career

He played for South of Scotland District.

International career

He was capped by Scotland 'B' 3 times, between 1977 and 1978.

His first full senior cap was New Zealand in 1978. He was capped a total of 9 times.

References

1954 births
Living people
Gala RFC players
Rugby union players from Galashiels
Scotland 'B' international rugby union players
Scotland international rugby union players
Scottish rugby union players
South of Scotland District (rugby union) players
Rugby union flankers